Tangeum Lake is an artificial lake at Chungju in South Korea.

The lake is located between Chungju Dam and another dam that regulates its flow. There are leisure facilities including Jungangtap Park and Keum Sports Park. The lake is surrounded by roads with good views. Each August there are water sports and cultural performances at the Riverside Stage near the lake. The River Fountain is located next to the Riverside Stage. There are also facilities for people to do bird watching.

The lake was the location for the 2013 World Rowing Championships between August 25 – September 1, 2013. It was also hosted 2019 Asian Rowing Championships between October 23 – 27, 2019.

See also 
 Chungju Lake

References 

Lakes of South Korea
Artificial lakes
Chungju
Rowing venues
Landforms of North Chungcheong Province